Teala Loring (born Marcia Eloise Griffin; October 6, 1922 – January 28, 2007) was an American actress who appeared in over 30 films during the 1940s.

Life and career
Born in Denver, Colorado, she was the sister of actors Debra Paget, Lisa Gaye, and Ruell Shayne. Her mother was Marguerite Gibson, who entertained in nightclubs and vaudeville. At the start of her film career, she was sometimes credited as Judith Gibson.

Beginning in 1942, Loring appeared in uncredited or bit parts in films at Paramount, turning up as a cigarette girl in Holiday Inn and as a telephone operator in Double Indemnity, for example.

From 1945 to 1947, she appeared in ten films released by the low-key Poverty Row studio Monogram Pictures, including Fall Guy (1947), and costarring in two films starring Kay Francis, Allotment Wives (1945) and Wife Wanted (1946).

Of her portrayal of a young mother caught up in an illegal adoption scheme in 1945's Black Market Babies, The New York Times noted that Loring and co-star Maris Wrixon "struggle fitfully with the lines accorded the two principal mothers" in what it called an "uninspired minor melodrama". Having failed to achieve the success that sister Paget would capture in the 1950s, Loring made her final film, Arizona Cowboy (supporting Western star Rex Allen in his screen debut), in 1950.

Death
Loring died at the age of 84 in January 2007 from injuries she sustained in an automobile accident in Spring, Texas. She was survived by her husband, Eugene Pickler, and their six children.

Selected filmography
 Sweethearts of the U.S.A. (1944)
 I Love a Soldier (1944)
 Gas House Kids (1946)
 Partners in Time (1946)
 Bowery Bombshell (1946)
 Riding the California Trail (1947)
 The Arizona Cowboy (1950)

 References 

 External links 

 
 
 
 Brief biography and filmography at [http://movies2.nytimes.com/gst/movies/filmography.html?p_id=43313 The New York Times]
 New York Times review of Black Market Babies, April 1, 1946 (registration required).

Actresses from Denver
American film actresses
Road incident deaths in Texas
1922 births
2007 deaths
20th-century American actresses
American stage actresses
Actresses from Texas
21st-century American women